Bacterial vaginosis (BV) is a disease of the vagina caused by excessive growth of bacteria. Common symptoms include increased vaginal discharge that often smells like fish. The discharge is usually white or gray in color. Burning with urination may occur. Itching is uncommon. Occasionally, there may be no symptoms. Having BV approximately doubles the risk of infection by a number of sexually transmitted infections, including HIV/AIDS. It also increases the risk of early delivery among pregnant women.

BV is caused by an imbalance of the naturally occurring bacteria in the vagina. There is a change in the most common type of bacteria and a hundred to thousand fold increase in total numbers of bacteria present. Typically, bacteria other than Lactobacilli become more common. Risk factors include douching, new or multiple sex partners, antibiotics, and using an intrauterine device, among others. However, it is not considered a sexually transmitted infection and, unlike gonorrhoea and chlamydia, sexual partners are not treated. Diagnosis is suspected based on the symptoms, and may be verified by testing the vaginal discharge and finding a higher than normal vaginal pH, and large numbers of bacteria. BV is often confused with a vaginal yeast infection or infection with Trichomonas.

Usually treatment is with an antibiotic, such as clindamycin or metronidazole. These medications may also be used in the second or third trimesters of pregnancy. However, the condition often recurs following treatment. Probiotics may help prevent re-occurrence. It is unclear if the use of probiotics or antibiotics affects pregnancy outcomes.

BV is the most common vaginal infection in women of reproductive age. The percentage of women affected at any given time varies between 5% and 70%. BV is most common in parts of Africa and least common in Asia and Europe. In the United States about 30% of women between the ages of 14 and 49 are affected. Rates vary considerably between ethnic groups within a country. While BV-like symptoms have been described for much of recorded history, the first clearly documented case occurred in 1894.

Signs and symptoms
Although about 50% of women with BV are asymptomatic, common symptoms include increased vaginal discharge that usually smells like fish. The discharge is often white or gray in color. There may be burning with urination. Occasionally, there may be no symptoms.

The discharge coats the walls of the vagina, and is usually without significant irritation, pain, or erythema (redness), although mild itching can sometimes occur. By contrast, the normal vaginal discharge will vary in consistency and amount throughout the menstrual cycle and is at its clearest at ovulation—about two weeks before the period starts. Some practitioners claim that BV can be asymptomatic in almost half of affected women, though others argue that this is often a misdiagnosis.

Complications
Although previously considered a mere nuisance infection, untreated bacterial vaginosis may cause increased susceptibility to sexually transmitted infections, including HIV, and pregnancy complications.

It has been shown that HIV-infected women with bacterial vaginosis (BV) are more likely to transmit HIV to their sexual partners than those without BV.
There is evidence of an association between BV and increased rates of sexually transmitted infections such as HIV/AIDS. BV is associated with up to a six-fold increase in HIV shedding. BV is a risk factor for viral shedding and herpes simplex virus type 2 infection. BV may increase the risk of infection with or reactivation of human papillomavirus (HPV).

In addition, bacterial vaginosis as either pre-existing, or acquired, may increase the risk of pregnancy complications, most notably premature birth or miscarriage.
Pregnant women with BV have a higher risk of chorioamnionitis, miscarriage, preterm birth, premature rupture of membranes, and postpartum endometritis. Women with BV who are treated with in vitro fertilization have a lower implantation rate and higher rates of early pregnancy loss.

Causes

Healthy vaginal microbiota consists of species that neither cause symptoms or infections, nor negatively affect pregnancy. It is dominated mainly by Lactobacillus species. BV is defined by the disequilibrium in the vaginal microbiota, with decline in the number of lactobacilli. While the infection involves a number of bacteria, it is believed that most infections start with Gardnerella vaginalis  creating a biofilm, which allows other opportunistic bacteria to thrive.

One of the main risks for developing BV is douching, which alters the vaginal microbiota and predisposes women to developing BV. Douching is strongly discouraged by the U.S. Department of Health and Human Services and various medical authorities, for this and other reasons.

BV is a risk factor for pelvic inflammatory disease, HIV, sexually transmitted infections (STIs), and reproductive and obstetric disorders or negative outcomes. Although BV can be associated with sexual activity, there is no clear evidence of sexual transmission. It is possible for sexually inactive persons to develop bacterial vaginosis.

Also, subclinical iron deficiency may correlate with bacterial vaginosis in early pregnancy. A longitudinal study published in February 2006, in the American Journal of Obstetrics and Gynecology, showed a link between psychosocial stress and bacterial vaginosis persisted even when other risk factors were taken into account. Exposure to the spermicide nonoxynol-9 does not affect the risk of developing bacterial vaginosis.

Diagnosis

To make a diagnosis of bacterial vaginosis, a swab from inside the vagina should be obtained. These swabs can be tested for:
 Gram stain which shows the depletion of lactobacilli and overgrowth of Gardnerella vaginalis  bacteria. Bacterial vaginosis is usually confirmed by  a Gram stain of vaginal secretions.
 A characteristic "fishy" odor on wet mount. This test, called the whiff test, is performed by adding a small amount of potassium hydroxide to a microscope slide containing the vaginal discharge. A characteristic fishy odor is considered a positive whiff test and is suggestive of bacterial vaginosis.
 Loss of acidity. To control bacterial growth, the vagina is normally slightly acidic with a pH of 3.8–4.2. A swab of the discharge is put onto litmus paper to check its acidity. A pH greater than 4.5 is considered alkaline and is suggestive of bacterial vaginosis.
 The presence of clue cells on wet mount. Similar to the whiff test, the test for clue cells is performed by placing a drop of sodium chloride solution on a slide containing vaginal discharge. If present, clue cells can be visualized under a microscope. They are so-named because they give a clue to the reason behind the discharge. These are epithelial cells that are coated with bacteria.

Differential diagnosis for bacterial vaginosis includes the following:
 Normal vaginal discharge.
 Candidiasis (thrush, or a yeast infection).
 Trichomoniasis, an infection caused by Trichomonas vaginalis.
 Aerobic vaginitis

The Center for Disease Control (CDC) defines STIs as "a variety of clinical syndromes and infections caused by pathogens that can be acquired and transmitted through sexual activity." But the CDC does not specifically identify BV as sexually transmitted infection.

Amsel criteria 
In clinical practice BV can be diagnosed using the Amsel criteria:

 Thin, white, yellow, homogeneous discharge
 Clue cells on microscopy
 pH of vaginal fluid >4.5
 Release of a fishy odor on adding alkali—10% potassium hydroxide (KOH) solution.

At least three of the four criteria should be present for a confirmed diagnosis.
A modification of the Amsel criteria accepts the presence of two instead of three factors and is considered equally diagnostic.

Gram stain

An alternative is to use a Gram-stained vaginal smear, with the Hay/Ison criteria or the Nugent criteria. The Hay/Ison criteria are defined as follows:
 Grade 1 (Normal): Lactobacillus morphotypes predominate.
 Grade 2 (Intermediate): Some lactobacilli present, but Gardnerella or Mobiluncus morphotypes also present.
 Grade 3 (Bacterial Vaginosis): Predominantly Gardnerella and/or Mobiluncus morphotypes. Few or absent lactobacilli. (Hay et al., 1994)
Gardnerella vaginalis is the main culprit in BV. Gardnerella vaginalis is a short, Gram-variable rod (coccobacillus). Hence, the presence of clue cells and gram variable coccobacilli are indicative or diagnostic of bacterial vaginosis.

Nugent score
The Nugent score is now rarely used by physicians due to the time it takes to read the slides and requires the use of a trained microscopist. A score of 0-10 is generated from combining three other scores.  The scores are as follows:
 0–3 is considered negative for BV
 4–6 is considered intermediate
 7+ is considered indicative of BV.
At least 10–20 high power (1000× oil immersion) fields are counted and an average determined.

DNA hybridization testing with Affirm VPIII was compared to the Gram stain using the Nugent criteria. The Affirm VPIII test may be used for the rapid diagnosis of BV in symptomatic women but uses expensive proprietary equipment to read results, and does not detect other pathogens that cause BV, including Prevotella spp, Bacteroides spp, and Mobiluncus spp. The cervicovaginal microbiome measured using 16S rRNA sequencing has the capacity to increase throughput of the Nugent Score and has demonstrate to be directly comparable to clinical Nugent Score measurement.

Screening
Screening during pregnancy is not recommended in the United States as of 2020 because " the US Preventive Services Task Force concludes that the current evidence is insufficient to assess the balance of benefits and harms of screening for bacterial vaginosis in pregnant persons at increased risk for preterm delivery".

Prevention
Some steps suggested to lower the risk include: not douching, avoiding sex, or limiting the number of sex partners.

One review concluded that probiotics may help prevent re-occurrence. Another review found that, while there is tentative evidence, it is not strong enough to recommend their use for this purpose.

Early evidence suggested that antibiotic treatment of male partners could re-establish the normal microbiota of the male urogenital tract and prevent the recurrence of infection. However, a 2016 Cochrane review found high-quality evidence that treating the sexual partners of women with bacterial vaginosis had no effect on symptoms, clinical outcomes, or recurrence in the affected women. It also found that such treatment may lead treated sexual partners to report increased adverse events.

Treatment

Antibiotics
Treatment is typically with the antibiotics metronidazole or clindamycin. They can be either given by mouth or applied inside the vagina with similar efficacy. About 10% to 15% of people, however, do not improve with the first course of antibiotics and recurrence rates of up to 80% have been documented. Recurrence rates are increased with sexual activity with the same pre-/posttreatment partner and inconsistent condom use although estrogen-containing contraceptives decrease recurrence. When clindamycin is given to pregnant women symptomatic with BV before 22 weeks of gestation the risk of pre-term birth before 37 weeks of gestation is lower.

Other antibiotics that may work include macrolides, lincosamides, nitroimidazoles, and penicillins.

Bacterial vaginosis is not considered a sexually transmitted infection, and treatment of a male sexual partner of a woman with bacterial vaginosis is not recommended.

Probiotics
A 2009 Cochrane review found tentative but insufficient evidence for probiotics as a treatment for BV. A 2014 review reached the same conclusion. A 2013 review found some evidence supporting the use of probiotics during pregnancy. The preferred probiotics for BV are those containing high doses of lactobacilli (around 109 ) given in the vagina. Intravaginal administration is preferred to taking them by mouth. Prolonged repetitive courses of treatment appear to be more promising than short courses.

The lack of effectiveness of commercially available Lactobacillus probiotics may be because most do not actually contain vaginal lactobacilli strains. LACTIN-V is a live biopharmaceutical medication containing the vaginally important Lactobacillus crispatus which is under development for the treatment of bacterial vaginosis and recurrent urinary tract infections. It has shown initial effectiveness in considerably reducing recurrence of bacterial vaginosis following antibiotic treatment. LACTIN-V is not yet Food and Drug Administration (FDA)-approved or commercially available.

Antiseptics
Topical antiseptics, for example dequalinium chloride, policresulen, hexetidine or povidone-iodine vaginal suppositories may be applied, if the risk of ascending infections is low (outside of pregnancy and in immunocompetent people without histories of upper genital tract infections). One study found that vaginal irrigations with hydrogen peroxide (3%) resulted in a slight improvement but this was much less than with the use of oral metronidazole. Intravaginal boric acid in conjunction with other medications may be helpful in the treatment of recurrent BV. TOL-463, a formulation of boric acid enhanced with ethylenediaminetetraacetic acid (EDTA), is under development as an intravaginal medication for the treatment of BV and has shown preliminary effectiveness.

Epidemiology
BV is the most common infection of the vagina in women of reproductive age. The percentage of women affected at any given time varies between 5% and 70%. BV is most common in parts of Africa, and least common in Asia and Europe. In the United States, about 30% of those between the ages of 14 and 49 are affected. Rates vary considerably between ethnic groups within a country.

References

External links 

 
Sexually transmitted diseases and infections
Inflammatory diseases of female pelvic organs
Wikipedia medicine articles ready to translate
Probiotics
Mycoplasma